Sheepshead, Sheephead, or Sheep's Head, may refer to:

Fish
 Archosargus probatocephalus, a medium-sized saltwater fish of the Atlantic Ocean 
 Freshwater drum, Aplodinotus grunniens, a medium-sized freshwater fish of North and Central America
 Semicossyphus, a genus of medium-sized saltwater wrasses of the Pacific Ocean
 Sheepshead minnow, Cyprinodon variegatus variegatus, a small brackish-water fish
 Sheepshead porgy, Calamus penna, a medium-sized saltwater fish of the Atlantic Ocean

Places
 Sheep's Head, a headland in Ireland
 Sheepshead Bay, Brooklyn, New York, United States
 Sheepshead Mountains

Other uses
 Smalahove, a dish made from a sheep's head
 Khash (dish)
 Sheepshead (card game), a trick-taking card game
 Sheepshead Bay Houses
 Sheepshead Bay Speedway
 Sheepshead Bay Stakes